Kanavand (also Romanized as Kanāvand, Kanawand, Kanvand, and Kenāvand) is a village in Zanjanrud-e Bala Rural District, in the Central District of Zanjan County, Zanjan Province, Iran. At the 2006 census, its population was 484, in 137 families.

References 

Populated places in Zanjan County